Coacalco de Berriozábal (simply known as Coacalco) is one of 125 municipalities in the State of Mexico, Mexico. The municipal seat is the city of San Francisco Coacalco.  The municipality lies in the Greater Mexico City conurbation, north of Mexico City. The municipal seat is San Francisco Coacalco and the municipality is named after Felipe Berriozábal (1829–1900), a Mexican politician and military leader.

The word Coacalco comes from the Nahuatl coatl (snake), calli (home) and -co (at), meaning "at the house of the snake", a name that was first recorded in 1320.

History
Coacalco de Berriozábal is part of the Valley of Mexico. It is located at the site of what was once the city-state of Xaltocan. Between 850 and 1521, the municipality was inhabited by Toltec people. In the 18th and 19th centuries, the main economic activities were agriculture, husbandry and salt harvesting. On 12 February 1862, General Felipe Berriozábal, then-governor of the state, signed an order that declared Coacalco an independent municipality, ending a 343-year-old dependency of Ecatepec.

Economy
The economy of Coacalco has changed since the 1970s. It switched from being primarily agricultural and rural to an urban industrial area. Since the 2000s, the municipality has become one of the principal commercial districts of the northern part of the metropolitan area.

Population

Located next to Mexico City, Coacalco's population has increased by more than 200,000 since 1970. In 2005, the city had a population of 252,555 people; by 2010, the population grew to 278,064 inhabitants. As of 2015, the total population was 284,462 inhabitants. By 2020, the total population soared to 293,444 inhabitants.

In the 2005 Mexican Human Development Index (HDI) statistic, Coacalco was rated as the tenth best place to live in the country.

Towns and villages
In 2010, the geographical subdivisions and their respective population were:

Sister cities
The sister cities of Coacalco de Berriozábal are:
Valle de Chalco, State of Mexico (2012).
Tangamandapio, Michoacán (2019).

Notable people
Notable residents include:
Aramís, Mexican wrestler.
Daga (b. 1987), Mexican wrestler.
Erik Pimentel (b. 1990), Mexican footballer.
Francisco Sierra (b. 1987), Mexican boxer.

See also

 San Francisco de Asís Parish (Coacalco de Berriozábal)

References

External links

 

1862 establishments in Mexico
 
Mexico City metropolitan area
Nahua settlements
Populated places in the State of Mexico